Heather E. Heying is an American evolutionary biologist, former professor, and author, who came to national attention following the Evergreen State College protests in 2017. She has been associated with the informal group known as the intellectual dark web and testified at the US Department of Justice forum on Free Speech on College Campuses in 2018. Heying is also known for her opposition to COVID-19 vaccines and her discredited belief that the drug ivermectin is effective in treating the disease.

Career 
Until 2017, Heying was a professor of biology at Evergreen State College in Washington State. Her doctoral research focused on the evolutionary ecology and sexual selection of Mantella laevigata, a Madagascan poison frog. In addition to papers in the reproductive evolutionary adaptations of frogs, Heying has also published a popular work describing her graduate student research in Madagascar, Antipode: Seasons with the Extraordinary Wildlife and Culture of Madagascar (2002).

Evergreen State College protests 
In July 2017, following a year of student protests at Evergreen State College, which disrupted the campus, including one altercation between protesters and Heying's husband and fellow professor of biology at Evergreen, Bret Weinstein, the pair brought a lawsuit against the college; the $3.85 million suit alleged the college failed to "protect its employees from repeated provocative and corrosive verbal and written hostility based on race, as well as threats of physical violence." A settlement was reached in September 2017, in which both Heying and Weinstein resigned, and received $250,000 each.

Post-Evergreen 
Following her resignation, Heying has written articles and opinion pieces related to evolution and cultural politics for journals and newspapers such as The New York Times and The Chronicle of Higher Education. She co-hosts a weekly podcast, the Darkhorse Podcast, with her husband on his YouTube channel.

Heying was a 2019–2020 James Madison Program Visiting Fellow at Princeton University, a fellowship which continued for the 2020–2021 year. With Weinstein, they presented a theory on the evolutionary adaptation of consciousness on 29 April 2020 .

In 2021, Heying and Weinstein's  book, A Hunter-Gatherer's Guide to the 21st Century, was published. Reviewing it for The Guardian, Stuart J. Ritchie wrote that the authors "lazily repeat false information from other pop-science books", and that overall the book was characterized by an annoying, know-it-all attitude. Writing for Willamette Week, Nancy Koppelman and Leo Blakeslee said that the book did well at covering basic topics around evolution and biology, but faltered when the authors claim expertise beyond their own fields such as in matters related to politics. Another review, written for Areo Magazine by English Literature graduate Daniel James Sharp, said the book was "a great, if also greatly flawed, achievement.".

COVID-19 

On January 29, 2021, Heying appeared on Real Time with Bill Maher along with Weinstein, presenting the "Lab Leak" hypothesis around the origins of SARS-CoV-2.

Heying has said that she has taken ivermectin to guard against COVID-19 and that she and Weinstein have not been vaccinated "because we have fears [about the side-effects of the COVID-19 vaccines], as we have discussed at length on this podcast." Heying compared the use of ivermectin for this purpose to taking anti-malarial drugs. Whereas all WHO-approved vaccines have shown a high level of safety and efficacy in all populations, there is no good evidence of benefit from ivermectin in preventing or treating COVID-19.

Publications 

 Heying, Heather E. (2001). The evolutionary ecology and sexual selection of a Madagascan poison frog (Mantella laevigata). Dissertation.

References

External links 

 

Year of birth missing (living people)
Living people
Women evolutionary biologists
Evergreen State College faculty
American biologists
American women scientists
Princeton University faculty
American women podcasters
American podcasters
21st-century American women
COVID-19 misinformation